The 2019 ROXOR 200 was a NASCAR Xfinity Series race held on July 20, 2019, at New Hampshire Motor Speedway in Loudon, New Hampshire. Contested over 200 laps on the  speedway, it was the 18th race of the 2019 NASCAR Xfinity Series season.

Background

Track

New Hampshire Motor Speedway is a  oval speedway located in Loudon, New Hampshire, which has hosted NASCAR racing annually since the early 1990s, as well as the longest-running motorcycle race in North America, the Loudon Classic. Nicknamed "The Magic Mile", the speedway is often converted into a  road course, which includes much of the oval.

The track was originally the site of Bryar Motorsports Park before being purchased and redeveloped by Bob Bahre. The track is currently one of eight major NASCAR tracks owned and operated by Speedway Motorsports.

Entry list

Practice

First practice

Final practice

Qualifying

Qualifying results

Ross Chastain qualified the No. 78 B. J. McLeod Motorsports Chevrolet for Vinnie Miller.

Race

Summary
Cole Custer started on pole, but Christopher Bell overtook him before the first lap, causing Custer to ultimately not lead a single lap during the race. The first caution occurred on lap 33 when John Hunter Nemechek's car backed into the wall due to brake failure, causing heavy rear-end damage from which he couldn't recover. By the end of Stage 1, Tyler Reddick drove low under Brandon Jones in a desperate attempt to overtake him. They battled on the frontstretch, nearly allowing Bell to capture the win, but Jones managed to hang on and win the stage.

Stage 2 did not see any cautions, and Bell was able to win the stage ahead of Justin Allgaier. On lap 142, Noah Gragson spun and the caution was thrown for debris. The ensuing restart tightened the field, with Paul Menard and Harrison Burton racing each other particularly hard. On lap 155, Menard slammed Burton, who spun and made contact with the wall. Burton was not able to recover from the damage sustained. Menard stated after the race that Burton had run into him twice earlier in the race and Menard was "voicing his displeasure". Bell pulled away and continued his dominating lead, eventually holding off Custer and winning the race.

Stage Results

Stage One
Laps: 45

Stage Two
Laps: 45

Final Stage Results

Stage Three
Laps: 110

References

NASCAR races at New Hampshire Motor Speedway
2019 in sports in New Hampshire
ROXOR 200
2019 NASCAR Xfinity Series